Thomas "Thom" Russo is an American record producer, composer, mixer and songwriter. His works range from Anglo-American pop/rock to Alternative Latin. He is a recipient of 16 Grammy awards.

Life and education
Thom Russo was born January 21, 1966, in Cleveland, Ohio.
He studied composition, music theory, and electronic music at Northwestern University, in Evanston, Illinois, graduating in 1988. He lives and works in Los Angeles.

Career
Russo started his professional career as a musician but became interested  in music production, composing, engineering and recording as a college student at Northwestern University Conservatory of Music.  He first worked at River North Studios in Chicago mentoring under many prolific composers and arrangers in the advertising industry, and then moved on to Larrabee Sound, one of the largest and most famous recording studios in Los Angeles, and later on his own under the Nettwerk Producer Management.

As one of the first projects at Larrabee in the early 1990s, Russo produced vocals for Michael Jackson's album Dangerous (1991), Bobby Brown's album Bobby (1992), Cher's Greatest Hits 1965–1992 (1993), Diana Ross's Take Me Higher (1995) and Paula Abdul's Head Over Heels (1995).

That early work laid foundation for Russo's later career. Over the years he has worked with a variety of well-known musicians, in addition to the ones named above,
 Alejandro Sanz (El Tren de los Momentos),
 Aterciopelados (Oye),
 Audioslave (Audioslave, Like a Stone, Doesn't Remind Me, Out of exile),
 Babyface (For the Cool in You, The Day, A Collection of His Greatest Hits),
 Bird York (The Velvet Hour, Wicked Little High),
 Don Tetto
 Enrique Iglesias (Enrique Iglesias),
 Eric Clapton (Change The World),
 Faith Evans (A Faithful Christmas, Keep the Faith),
 Huecco (Assalto, Huecco),
 Jay-Z (99 Problems),
 Jermaine Dupri (12 Soulful Nights of Christmas),
 Jesse and Joy (Electricidad),
 Johnny Cash (American IV: The Man Comes Around),
 Juanes (Fíjate Bien, Un Día Normal, Mi Sangre, La Vida... Es Un Ratico),
 Lili Haydn (Place Between Places),
 Libido (Pop*Porn),
 Love Star (Espectro),
 Macy Gray (The Id, The Trouble with Being Myself, The Very Best of Macy Gray),
 Maná (Amar es Combatir, Drama y Luz),
 Michael Jackson (King of Pop),
Pedro Suárez-Vértiz (Amazonas),

 Toto (Kingdom of Desire)
 Los Claxons (Un Día De Sol)
 Alan Munro (Ojala)
and others; full listings are available.

Since 2000, Russo has been involved in Latin rock and pop music and has worked with Juanes, Mana, and other legendary Latin artists from Latin America, Central America, and Spain.

Russo's mixing techniques include the commonly used audio filtering with different microphones and equalizers, reduction and amplification by DRC, sound fading, and a range of more unconventional approaches. He adapts his methods to accentuate the idiosyncratic features in the music he records, citing the record producer and colleague Rick Rubin as one of the main professional influences.

Awards
Russo has received 12 platinum record awards for his work in the music industry, and won 2 American Grammy Awards and 12 Latin Grammy Awards (listed below in chronological order).

 Rock Solo Vocal Album award for Fíjate Bien, Latin Academy of Recording Arts & Sciences, 2001, engineer/mixer
 Nomination for Album of the Year award, for Fijate Bien, Latin Academy of Recording Arts & Sciences, 2001, engineer/mixer
 Nomination for Record of the Year award for El Alma al Aire, Latin Academy of Recording Arts & Sciences, 2001, engineer/mixer
 Album of the Year award, for Un Día Normal, Latin Academy of Recording Arts & Sciences, 2003, engineer/mixer
 Best Rock Solo Vocal Album award for Un Día Normal, Latin Academy of Recording Arts & Sciences, 2003, engineer/mixer
 Record of the Year award for Es Por Ti, Latin Academy of Recording Arts & Sciences, 2003, engineer/mixer
 Best Rock Solo Vocal Album award for Mi Sangre, Latin Academy of Recording Arts & Sciences, 2005, engineer/mixer
 Best Latin Rock, Alternative or Urban Album award for Amar es Combatir, National Academy of Recording Arts and Sciences, 2006, engineer/mixer
 Best Latin Pop Album award for El Tren de los Momentos, National Academy of Recording Arts and Sciences, 2007, engineer
 Best Alternative Music Album award for Oye, Latin Academy of Recording Arts & Sciences, 2007, engineer
 Album of the Year award for La Vida... Es Un Ratico, Latin Academy of Recording Arts & Sciences, 2008, engineer/mixer
 Record of the Year award for Me Enamora, Latin Academy of Recording Arts & Sciences, 2008, engineer/mixer
 Best Male Pop Vocal Album award for La Vida... Es Un Ratico, Latin Academy of Recording Arts & Sciences, 2008, engineer
 Best Engineered Album award, for Distinto, Latin Academy of Recording Arts & Sciences, 2010, engineer
 Best Engineered Album award, for Drama Y Luz, Latin Academy of Recording Arts & Sciences, 2011, engineer
 Best Rock Album award, for Drama Y Luz, Latin Academy of Recording Arts & Sciences, 2011, engineer

Film and TV Projects

References

External links 
 YouTube interview
 Personal web page

1969 births
Living people
Record producers from Ohio
Songwriters from Ohio
Latin Grammy Award winners
Musicians from Cleveland